Hiwasse was an unincorporated census-designated place in Benton County, Arkansas, United States. As of the 2010 census, its population was 497. It is the location of (or is the nearest community to) Hiwasse Bank Building, which is located at Main St., AR 279 and Banks House, which is located on AR 72 west of Hiwasse.  Both are listed on the National Register of Historic Places.

Hiwasse faced a great division in 2007–2008, when two groups faced off over the incorporation of Hiwasse. In the end, the voters decided not to incorporate, with adjacent Gravette annexing the community in 2012.

Education 
Public education for elementary and secondary students is provided by Gravette School District, which leads to graduation from Gravette High School.

References

Census-designated places in Benton County, Arkansas
Census-designated places in Arkansas